Belgium competed in the 2020 Summer Paralympics in Tokyo, Japan from 25 August to 6 September.

Medalists

Competitors

Archery 

Piotr Van Montagu has qualified to compete following winning a silver medal at the Paralympic Qualifying Tournament.

|-
|align=left|Piotr Van Montagu
|align=left|Men's individual compound
|683 PB
|18
|W 143-130
|L 142-143
|colspan=4|Did not qualify
|}

Athletics 

Men's track

Women's track

Women's field

Boccia 

Belgium have qualified to compete at boccia for the first time via world rankings.

Cycling 

Diederick Schelfhout, Ewoud Vromant, Griet Hoet, Jean-François Deberg, Jonas Van De Steene, Laurence Vandevyver, Maxime Hordies and Tim Celen have all qualified to compete.

Road
Men

Women

Mixed

Track
Men

Women

Equestrian 

Belgium have four riders qualified to compete including Barbara Minneci, Kevin Van Ham, Manon Claeys and Michèle George.

Individual

Team

Goalball

Belgium men's national goalball team qualified by winning the bronze medal at the 2018 Goalball World Championships.

Men

Group stage

Swimming

Belgium have qualified two swimmers, one male and one female, to compete at the 2020 Summer Paralympics.
Men

Table tennis

Belgium entered three athletes into the table tennis competition at the games. Laurens Devos & Florian Van Acker qualified from 2019 ITTF European Para Championships which was held in Helsingborg, Sweden.

Men

Wheelchair tennis

Belgium qualified two players entries for wheelchair tennis. All of them qualified by the world rankings.

See also
Belgium at the Paralympics
Belgium at the 2020 Summer Olympics

References

Nations at the 2020 Summer Paralympics
2020
2021 in Belgian sport